Vieri is an Italian surname. Notable people with the surname include:

Christian Vieri (born 1973), Italian international footballer, striker, son of Roberto and brother of Max
Francesco de Vieri, called Verino the second (1524-1591), Italian philosopher
Lido Vieri (born 1939), Italian international football manager and former professional footballer, goalkeeper
Max Vieri (born 1978), Australian international football (soccer) player, son of Roberto and brother of Christian 
Roberto Vieri (born 1946), Italian footballer, father of Christian and Max

See also
 Viera
 Vieira
 Oliveira (surname)
 Oliver (given name)

References

Italian-language surnames